Thespidium is a genus of Australian plants in the daisy family.

Species
The only known species is Thespidium basiflorum, native to northern Australia (Queensland, Northern Territory, Western Australia).

References

Inuleae
Monotypic Asteraceae genera
Endemic flora of Australia
Taxa named by Ferdinand von Mueller